Combat Logistics Regiment 27 (CLR 27) is a logistics regiment based at Marine Corps Base Camp Lejeune, North Carolina and falls under the command of the 2nd Marine Logistics Group (2nd MLG) and the II Marine Expeditionary Force (II MEF), United States Marine Corps.

Current mission

Provide scalable, expeditionary Logistics Combat Element (LCE) command and control for the MLG.  Serve as the LCE headquarters for a MEB, and when augmented, serve as the headquarters for the MLG Forward. Provide LCE command, control and coordination for prepositioning operations. Provide LCE support services to the MEF.  Provide the LCE for Marine Expeditionary Units (MEUs).

Subordinate units

CLR 27 currently consists of 2d Landing Support Battalion, 2d Transportation Battalion, 8th Engineer Support Battalion, and Headquarters Company which contains the regiment and 2nd MLG headquarters element (Commanding General, Chief of Staff, Group Sergeant Major, Regimental Commanding Officer, Regimental Executive Officer, and Regimental Sergeant Major) as well as the Commanding General's staff sections.

History
The unit was activated 1 August 1944 at Pearl Harbor as Headquarters and Service Battalion, 8th Field Depot, Supply Service, Fleet Marine Force, under the commanding officer 2ndLt Gordon McPherson. The unit participated in the Volcano and Ryukyu Islands campaign, most notably, the Battle of Iwo Jima from 19 February to 26 March 1945 providing logistics support to Marines on the front line. In April 1945, it was relocated to Hilo, Hawaii. The following September, the unit was reassigned to the 2nd Marine Division, and moved to Marine Corps Base Camp Lejeune, its current home. On 13 October 1950 it was re-designated as Headquarters and Service Battalion.

On 1 April 1951, the unit was reassigned to Fleet Marine Force, Atlantic, as a part of Force Service Regiment. Personnel and equipment from the battalion participated in the landings of the 1958 Lebanon crisis, and also provided support to mobilized troops during the Cuban Missile Crisis in late 1962. 

The unit provided relief in autumn 1989 to South Carolina and Puerto Rico in the aftermath of Hurricane Hugo. A month later, elements of the battalion would participate in the United States invasion of Panama. The following year, the unit would deploy to the Middle East for the Gulf War, remaining for Operation Provide Comfort until July 1991. From November 1991 to October 1994, the group supported Haitian refugee operations after the 1991 Haitian coup d'état. Disaster relief efforts from the unit supported Miami-Dade County, Florida after Hurricane Andrew in late 1992, then elements participated in Operation Provide Promise in Bosnia and Herzegovina in the summer of 1994.

In December 2002, the unit was sent to Kuwait for more local support, and would then participate in the 2003 invasion of Iraq and subsequent Iraq War. On 21 April 2006, the battalion was re-designated as Combat Logistics Regiment 27, 2d Marine Logistics Regiment. The regiment provided personnel and equipment for year-long deployment tours to support Multi-National Forces West in Al Anbar Governorate. The final deployment as a regiment was in Al Taqaddum where the unit served as 2d Marine Logistics Regiment Headquarters element, and the unit deployed for its last Iraq tour in January 2009.

On 1 August 2014 the regiment was re-designated as Headquarters Regiment, and then was re-designated back to Combat Logistics Regiment 27 (CLR 27) on 1 October 2018. Currently, CLR 27 supports 2d MLG and II MEF in global expeditionary operations.

Commanding officers
Commanding Officers, 8th Field Depot, Headquarters and Service Bn 2D FSSG, CLR 27, HQ Reg 2D MLG

2ndLt              Godon Mcpherson                   1 Aug 1944 - 29 Apr 1945

1stLt                Louis A. Sullivan                     30 Apr 1945 - 31 May 1945

LtCol               James F. Sherman                  1 Jun 1945 - 28 Aug 1945

Maj                  William H. McCormich             29 Aug 1945 - 19 Nov 1945

Maj                  Joseph T. Smith                       20 Nov 1945 - 6 Aug 1946

LtCol               Robert E. Stannah                    7 Aug 1946 - 29 Oct 1946

Capt                Oscar W. Cargile                      20 Oct 1946 - 14 Dec 1946

Maj                  Arthur J. Barret                        15 Dec 1946 - 19 Jun 1947

Maj                  Lewis D. Baughman                 20 Jun 1947- 16 Aug 1947

LtCol               John A McAdister                     17 Aug 1947 - 16 Sep 1947

Maj                  Julian V. Lyon                          17 Sep 1947 - 11 Jan 1948

Maj                  John R. Barriero                       12 Jan 1948 - 18 Mar 1948

LtCol               Maurice T. Ireland                     19 Mar 1948 - 22 Jul 1948

LtCol               Frances C. Clagett                    23 Jul 1948 - 31 Oct 1948

Maj                  Richard W. Schutt                     1 Nov 1948 - 29 Jul 1949

Maj                 Wilbert T. Shafer                        30 Jul 1949 - 24 Oct 1949

1stLt               Frederick S. Thomas                  25 Oct 1949 - 4 Mar 1950

Redesignated as Headquarters and Service Battalion on 13 Oct 1950 

1stLt               George D. Mooer                         5 Mar 1950 - 1 Jan 1951

Maj                  Wilbert T. Shafer                         2 Jan 1950 - 28 May 1951

Maj                  Frederick D. Cortner                   29 May 1951 - 20 Jan 1952

1stLt                William F. Russel, Jr.                  21 Jan 1952 - 13 Mar 1952

LtCol                Walter S. Haskell, Jr.                  14 Mar 1952 - 8 Apr 1953

Maj                   Robert J. Kash, Jr.                      9 Apr 1953 - 23 Sep 1953

LtCol                Theodore P. Watson                   24 Sep 1953 - 20 Nov 1953

LtCol                Walter S. Haskell                         21 Nov 1953 - 29 Nov 1953

Maj                   William R. Popke                         30 Nov 1953 - 15 Feb 1954

Maj                   Robert J. Kash, Jr.                       16 Feb 1954 - 10 Dec 1955

Maj                   Wilbur J. Buss                              11 Dec 1955 - 8 Jan 1956

Maj                    Victor E. Wade                            17 Feb 1956 - 12 May 1958

LtCol                 William L. Batchelor                     13 May 1958 - 28 Oct 1959

LtCol                  Russell E. McCreery                   29 Oct 1959 - 7 Jun 1960

Maj                    George M. Faser                          8 Jun 1960 - 18 Mar 1961

Maj                     Thomas O. Weghorst                  18 Mar 1961 - 1 Jun 1961

Maj                     Junius M. Lowder                         2 Jun 1961 - 26 Oct 1962

LtCol                   Edward L. Roberts                       27 Oct 1962 - 27 Jul 1963

Maj                      Leonar Schoenberger                  28 Jul 1963 - 2 Sep 1963

LtCol                    Frederick A. Quint                        3 Sep 1963 - 30 Jun 1965

LtCol                    Clifford J. Peabody                      1 Jul 1965 - 4 Mar 1966

LtCol                    Harry D. Woods                           5 Mar 1966 - 25 Jun 1967

Maj                      Donald O. Coughlin                       26 Jun 1967 - 6 Jul 1967

Maj                      Ronald L. Payne                            7 Jul 1967 - 20 Jul 1967

Maj                      Charles L. McElheny                      21 Jul 1967 - 26 Nov 1967

LtCol                    James H. Landers                         27 Nov 1967 - 24 Jun 1968

Maj                      Warren H. Day                               25 Jun 1968 - 7 Oct 1968

LtCol                    John W. Wiita                                18 Feb 1968 - 18 Dec 1970

LtCol                    John B. Cantieny                           19 Dec 1970 - 30 Sep 1971

LtCol                    Ralph Fortie                                    1 Oct 1971 - 25 Jul 1972

Maj                       Malcome G. Gregory                      26 Jul 1972 - 10 Sep 1972

LtCol                    J. B. Harris                                      11 Sep 1972 - 28 Jun 1973

Maj                       Robert E. Burgess                           29 Jun 1973 - 31 Jul 1973

LtCol                     Roy M. Marks                                  1 Aug 1973 - 20 Dec 1974

Maj                        Donald E. Sudduth                          21 Dec 1974 - 31 Dec 1975

LtCol                      Cleo P. Stapleton, Jr.                      1 Feb 1975 - 20 Aug 1976

Maj                         Robert D. Dasch                             21 Aug 1976 - 26 Aug 1976

LtCol                       "Billy" W. Adams                             27 Aug 1976 - 12 Jul 1978

Maj                          James P. Crowley                           13 Jul 1978 - 12 Sep 1978

LtCol                        George R. Griggs                           13 Sep 1978 - 12 Sep 1978

LtCol                        Richard S. Pyne                              10 Jan 1980 - *(as of 31 Dec 1980)

LtCol                        George E. Turner, Jr.                       *(as of 1 Jan 1982) - 10 Jun 1982

LtCol                        Frederick W. Beekman III                 11 Jun 1982 - *( as of 31 Dec 1982)

Lt Col                       William C. Shaver                            *(as of 1 Jan 1984) - 27 Jun 1985

LtCol                        Ronald D. Sortino                              28 Jun 1985 - 27 May 1987

Col                           Robert R. Green                                28 May 1987 - 22 Apr 1988 

LtCol                        Michael G. Roth                                 23 Apr 1988 - *( as of 31 Dec 1989)

LtCol                        James E. Vesley                                *(Unk) - 2 Jul 1991

LtCol                        George E. Holmes                              3 Jul 1991 - 25 Jun 1992

LtCol                         James E. Hull                                     26 Jun 1992 - 8 Jun 1993

LtCol                         Robert C. Dickerson                           9 Jun 1993 - 17 Nov 1994

LtCol                         Andrew J. Peters                                18 Nov 1994 - 6 Jun 1996

LtCol                         M. Wayne Phillips                               7 Jun 1996 - 31 Aug 1997

Col                            M. Wayne Philips                                 1 Sep 1998 - 26 Jun 1998

LtCol                         Jeffrey D. Everest                                27 Jun 1998 - 15 Jun 2000

LtCol                         Richard E. Smith                                  16 June 2000 - 14 June 2002

LtCol                         Craig C. Crenshaw                               15 Jun 2002 - 29 Jun 2004 

LtCol                         John R. Gambrino                                30 Jun 2004 - 14 Jan 2005

LtCol                         David M. Smith                                     15 Jan 2005 - 21 Apr 2006

Redesignated as Combat Logistics Regiment 27, 2D Marine Logistics Regiment on 21 April 2006 

Col                             William M. Faulkner                              21 Apr 2006- 31 Aug 2006

Col                             David M. Smith                                      1 Sep 2006 - 3 Mar 2008

Col                             William M. Faulkner                               3 Mar 2008 - 28 Mar 2008

Col                              Vincent A. Coglianese                          28 Mar 2008 - 9 Jan 2009

Col                              Douglas C. Linden                                10 Jan 2009 - 24 Nov 2009 

Col                              Brian T. Oliver                                        24 Nov 2009 - 5 Jan 2010

Col                              Vincent A. Coglianese                            6 Jan 2010 - 14 Jun 2010

Col                              Mark R. Hollahan                                    14 Jun 2010 - 30 Nov 2010

LtCol                           Gary Keim                                               1 Dec 2010 - 22 Mar 2011

Col                              Gary Keim                                                23 Mar 2011 - 30 Sep 2011

LtCol                           Kevin G. Collins                                       1 Oct 2011 - 31 Dec 2011

LtCol                           Christopher G. Downs                             1 Jan 2012 - 19 Mar 2012

Col                               Mark R. Hollahan                                    19 Mar 2012 - 14 Dec 2012

Col                               Gary F. Keim                                            14 Dec 2012-

Redesignated as Headquarters Regiment, 2D Marine Logistics Group on 1 Aug 2014. Redesignated as Combat Logistics Regiment 27, 2D Marine Logistics Group 1 Oct 2018 

Col                                Neibel

Col                                B. A. Miller

Col                                Brian W. Mullery

See also

 List of United States Marine Corps regiments
 Organization of the United States Marine Corps

References
Notes

Web

 CLR-27's official website

Combat logistics regiments of the United States Marine Corps